Paxiximyia is a genus of parasitic flies in the family Tachinidae.

Species
Paxiximyia sulmatogrossensis Toma & Olivier, 2018

Distribution
Brazil.

References

Diptera of South America
Exoristinae
Tachinidae genera